An alder carr is a particular type of carr, i.e. waterlogged wooded terrain populated with alder trees.

Examples
 Alder Carr, Hildersham
 Alderfen Broad
 Fawley Ford on the Beaulieu River
 Biebrza National Park
 Fen Alder Carr
 Harston Wood
 Holywells Park, Ipswich: Pond 5 is known as Alder Carr and is a biodiversity action plan habitat. Historically there was another Alder Carr in the Cobbold family estate in what is now the northern edge of the Landseer Park.
 Jackson's Coppice and Marsh
 Loynton Moss

Gallery

References

Landforms
Wetlands